Atong (Atoŋ) is a Grassfields language of Cameroon and closely related to the languages Menka [mea] and Manta [myg].

References

Southwest Grassfields languages
Languages of Cameroon